McGregor is a census-designated place (CDP) in Lee County, Florida, United States. The population was 7,976 at the 2020 census. It is part of the Cape Coral-Fort Myers, Florida Metropolitan Statistical Area.

A strong EF2 tornado struck the town on January 16, 2022, causing major damage.

Geography
McGregor is located in central Lee County at  (26.563603, -81.909692), in an unincorporated part of the county. It is bordered to the east by Whiskey Creek, to the southeast by Cypress Lake, and to the southwest by Iona, all unincorporated. McGregor is bordered to the northwest by the tidal Caloosahatchee River, across which is the city of Cape Coral. The Cape Coral Bridge crosses the Caloosahatchee River from McGregor.

Florida State Road 867 (McGregor Boulevard) is the main road through the community. It leads northeast  to the center of Fort Myers, the Lee county seat, and southwest  to San Carlos Boulevard in Iona.

Demographics

As of the census of 2000, there were 7,136 people, 3,295 households, and 2,296 families residing in the CDP. The racial makeup of the CDP was 96.09% White, 0.84% African American, 0.20% Native American, 1.56% Asian, 0.39% from other races, and 0.92% from two or more races. Hispanic or Latino of any race were 2.91% of the population.

There were 3,295 households, out of which 17.8% had children under the age of 18 living with them, 62.0% were married couples living together, 5.7% had a female householder with no husband present, and 30.3% were non-families. 25.0% of all households were made up of individuals, and 13.7% had someone living alone who was 65 years of age or older.  The average household size was 2.17 and the average family size was 2.55.

In the CDP, the population was spread out, with 15.0% under the age of 18, 3.3% from 18 to 24, 19.2% from 25 to 44, 31.9% from 45 to 64, and 30.6% who were 65 years of age or older.  The median age was 53 years. For every 100 females, there were 92.3 males.  For every 100 females age 18 and over, there were 89.8 males.

The median income for a household in the CDP was $57,628, and the median income for a family was $67,353. Males had a median income of $52,151 versus $31,732 for females. The per capita income for the CDP was $45,240.  About 1.3% of families and 3.3% of the population were below the poverty line, including 2.7% of those under age 18 and 2.6% of those age 65 or over.

References

Census-designated places in Lee County, Florida
Census-designated places in Florida